Antenna Sicilia is a regional Italian television station own and operated by La Sicilia, a daily newspaper for the island of Sicily. The most popular program of the channel is "Insieme" (translation Together).

External links
www.antennasicilia.it

Television channels and stations established in 1979
Television channels in Italy